Peter Cat Recording Co. is a Delhi-based band that was founded in 2009. The band consists of five members: Suryakant Sawhney (vocals and guitar), Karan Singh (drums), Dhruv Bhola (bass and samples), Rohit Gupta (keys and trumpet) and Kartik Sundareshan Pillai (keyboards, guitar, electronics and trumpet). In 2018, they signed to Paris based label Panache and released their first record Portrait of a Time: 2010 - 2016. In June 2019, they released Bismillah.

With two new members on board since 2017, the decade-old band is now "a self-aware organism", said frontman Suryakant Sawhney – a "more well-oiled machine" than ever before. It still retains three of its older members: Sawhney, the principal songwriter; Kartik Pillai on keyboard, guitars, trumpet and electronics; and Karan Singh on drums. After bassist Rohan Kulshreshtha's departure, bassist-songwriter Dhruv Bhola and trumpet player-keyboardist Rohit Gupta joined the group.

History

2008–2014: Early years 
In 2008, Suryakant Sawhney had a spiritual experience in San Francisco which led him to believe that he should seriously examine a career in music. After a summer in Calcutta, he decided to create a band named Peter Cat Recording Co. along with roommate Jeff Abplanalp who proceeded to learn the bass guitar in order to be a part of it all. As he began working on what would become part of the first album, he met Jeremy Cox of the Royal Baths at a party at their house. As Jeremy proceeded with slowly re-dressing himself into a drag queen during the duration of that particular evening, he drunkenly proposed to Suryakant that he would record and help produce some demos for him. He kept his word and one of those demos would end up being part of the final version of the "Clown on the 22nd floor".

In early 2010, family and financial compulsions forced him to shift back to India to the city of Gurgaon, Haryana. Still eager to continue with his musical ambitions and now armed with an album worth of songs, he spent the year recording and learning how to produce music himself.  In the meantime, he began to play with Rohan Kulshreshtha, Anindya Shankar and Karan Singh, formerly of the metal band Lycanthropia. During the recording period (a period of few months wherein he lacked a drummer), Caleb Prabhakar stepped in and tracked drums for several of the songs and by December 31, 2010, the debut album was ready with mastering happening on the same day itself. Sinema was released on January 1, 2011, at a house party in Delhi, through the band's website and Bandcamp. It was originally priced at 2000 USD per download, eventually brought down to a manageable number of 10.

Sinema with its heady mix of jazz, cabaret, pop and noisier sounds launched PCRC into its true existence and a tour was planned in order to promote the album. Rohan, acting as defacto manager and booking agent managed to book a number of shows in various Indian cities such as Delhi, Mumbai, Bangalore, Chennai, Goa and Chandigarh. In order to make the tour cost effective, the band proceeded to drive all around the country along with most of their gear, performing one night and leaving the very next morning. in 2011, they continued to perform the album whenever they could and managed to release a music video for their song Love Demons, starring themselves and completely produced in house.

On January 1, 2012, the band released an album of raw demos and other experimental recordings, titled Wall of Want. As the band progressed, Anindya Shankar left the band and was replaced by guitarist Kartik Sundareshan Pilllai, a friend of a friend, who had unknown to the band, also mixed them at their Sinema album launch. As Karan and Kartik shifted residence to the rooftop of the infamous building 87a in Hauz Khas Village, Delhi, they began playing more shows around them and launched a series of secret house party concerts, finally being raided by the police and being forced to shut down. They continued writing new music and rehearse from 87a. Sometime in 2014, Kartik decided to take up trumpet adding another dimension to the PCRC sound.

2015–2018: Transmissions, Panache and Portrait of a Time 
Five years on from Sinema, in 2015, the band launched its spiritual successor, Climax. It expanded on the PCRC sound adding a horn amongst other things. The album was followed by self-produced videos for "I'm Home" and "Copulations". The band launched it with a show at Social in Hauz Khas Village. They proceeded to organize another tour around India, which resulted in Suryakant crashing a car during their drive from Kartik's ancestral home in Kerala to Bangalore. The band finished the remainder of their tour using trains and flights.

The following year, they worked on a release titled Transmissions, which relied on the band writing, recording and producing a new song every week for two months.

By the summer of 2018, the band had been contacted by a new boutique French label, Panache, who suggested releasing a compilation on vinyl which would include music from several of their releases.

After seven years, tension in the band regarding its direction and future reached an impasse, and Rohan Kulshreshtha left the band. On Kartik’s suggestion, he was replaced by 2 young new members, Rohit Gupta and Dhruv Bhola (Run It's the Kid). Portrait of a Time: 2010 - 2016 was released on March 1, 2018. This was proceeded by the band completely expunging its past and beginning again.

2015–present: Bismillah
Following the release of Portrait of a Time, work began on a new album. It was decided that the band would record it at Stefan Kaye's farmhouse in Sainik Farms, Delhi. The band proceeded to record most of it there, with a few songs happening in Paris at Spectral studios of Robin le Duc. The band decided to debut of their new material at an all night long show at Magnetic Fields Festival in Rajasthan. They partnered up with Pagal Haina who subsequently became their management.

Suryakant and Robin proceeded to mix the album in Paris itself and Bismillah was released in 2019. It was followed by a series of shows around India and Europe, promoting the record.

Notable releases

 Portrait of a Time (2018)
Portrait of a Time is nostalgia induced through nine steps of listening on a compilation which resonates of days gone by (with hope for more) especially, for those of us who have been following the band's journey in the capital city. Amongst the tracks included in the album, "Bebe De Vyah" emerges from the throes of obscurity as one which might have been least heard. "Love Demons", "Happiness" and "Clown on the 22nd Dance Floor" are the more familiar pieces which resonate with PCRC's brilliance as a psychedelic gypsy jazz ensemble. Peter Cat Recording Co. is often considered an anomaly in Delhi. The band has thrived as a spectacle celebrating the drudgery that their home city offers, much like a circus; Portrait of a Time is a retrospective tribute to this reversal of dread to magic.  The album takes its name from a song on the album. It's a stunning piece that opens up as a bouncy jazz number with a jubilant, swooning, deeply romantic chorus ("I was someone – someone who would disagree / Now I'm here to ride this Lamborghini to you"), before it slides into a low-key electronic bridge, all crunching claps and underwater guitar – and then that chorus returns. The track was originally recorded in a living room. That was in 2015, but a new, remastered version appears on the compilation.

 Bismillah (2019)
A stumbling but gracious collection of songs rooted in a kind of drunken soul music, the melancholy nature of some of the songs on Bismillah renders them almost liquid, before they develop into more dance-like shapes. Voice swoops from the falsetto glide of "I'm This" to the beat-up baritone blown along by the warm breeze of "Soulless Friends". The elliptical structure of album opener, "Where the Money Flows", also allows for the use of brief bursts of auto-tune effect on his vocal without feeling incongruous, whilst the desultory lyrics of "Heera" (a Hindi word for "diamond") - have an emotional weight that would impress even coming from a native English speaker. Perhaps the most gleefully unpredictable moment on Bismillah comes with the illusory, vocal loops on the intro to "Memory Box", erupting into eight minutes' worth of unbridled disco joy.

 Happy Holidays (2020)
In the quarantine of 2020 imposed due to the COVID-19 pandemic, the band decided to round up older, rejected material as well as one previously released song for a compilation called Happy Holidays, which is out via Bandcamp and Instamojo. Similar to their 2012 release, Wall of Want, Peter Cat Recording Co. present demos as well as polished songs written by bassist Dhruv Bhola ("Work Clothes"), trumpet, synth and guitarist-vocalist Kartik Pillai ("Go Home"), vocalist-guitarist Suryakant Sawhney (who leads vocals on "Glass or 2" and "Jee Jee") and multi-instrumentalist Rohit Gupta. "Clouds", a song off their 2015 album Climax now makes a reappearance in the band's online catalog as the opening track on Happy Holidays. The band highlighted that there are "obviously more serious and important things going on around the world right now", hinting towards grim times ahead for humanity and the planet at large. "This may be only the underwater earthquake before the tsunami, and it's impossible to say what's on the other side, but one thing is certain, there's no going back, and there shouldn't be", the statement adds. The band wrote in the mailer they sent out to their fanbase: "While Bismillah was the end of an era of learning for this humble little group, the next proper release will be something more monumental and important, and a welcome to the new world. Until then, here's a small group of songs we wrote and rejected a long time ago. This is an exorcism in the form of a greeting card".

Discography

Albums

Singles
 "Love Demons" (Portrait of a Time; 2018)
 "I'm Home" (Portrait of a Time; 2018)
 "Copulations" (Portrait of a Time; 2018)
 "Floated By" (Bismillah; 2019)
 "Where the Money Flows" (Bismillah; 2019)

Music videos
 "Love Demons" (2012)
 "I'm Home" (2018)
 "Floated By" (2019)
 "Where the Money Flows" (2019)
 "We're Getting Married" (2019)
 "Copulations" (2020)

Band members
Current members
 Suryakant Sawhney – vocals, guitar (2009–present)
 Kartik Sundareshan Pillai – keyboards, guitar, electronics and trumpet (2012–present)
 Dhruv Bhola – bass and samples (2017–present)
 Karan Singh – drums (2010–present)
 Rohit Gupta – keys and trumpet (2017–present)

Past members
 Rohan Kulshreshtha (2010-2017)
 Anindya Shankar (2010-2012)

Tours and live shows

Europe 
Leuven, BE / M-Idzomer

London, UK / Meltdown Festival

Vendor, NL / ZomerParkFest

Groningen, NL / Noorderzon

Paris, FR / Rock En Seine

Maastricht, NL / Bruins Festival

Island of Vieland, NL / Into The Great Wide Open

India 
A self-produced, curated album release across five cities called Made in India

Bangalore / Skydeck

Delhi / QLA Terrace

Bombay / G5A (2 shows)

Hyderabad / The Moonshine Project

Chandigarh / Upstairs Club

Accolades 
 Peter Cat Recording Co. was nominated for Best Band and Best Song (‘Clown On The 22nd Floor’) at 2011 Jack Daniel’s Rock Awards.  
 For the Toto Funds The Arts Jury of 2012, it was Delhi based band Peter Cat Recording Company who stole the show – with the act’s potent elixir of multimedia experimentation, DIY inspired creative processes and raw artistic appeal. Two years after having won the award, the four members of this unique collaborative project are well on their way to establishing their own individual niches in the Indian indie space – with every member also pursuing solo paths that they ultimately bring back to their Peter Cat creations.

References

External links
Official Website

Indian indie rock groups